The men's field hockey tournament at the 1988 Summer Olympics was the 16th edition of the field hockey event for men at the Summer Olympics. It was held from 18 September to 1 October 1988.

Great Britain beat West Germany 3–1 in the final to win their third Olympic gold medal. The Netherlands won the bronze medal by defeating Australia 2–1.

Squads

Umpires

K Bajwa (PAK)
Amarjit Bawa (IND)
Santiago Deo (ESP)
Adriano de Vecchi (ITA)
Amjarit Dhak (KEN)
A Gantz (CHI)
Louismichel Gillet (FRA)
Richard Kentwell (USA)
Rob Lathouwers (NED)
Craig Madden (SCO)
Graham Nash (ENG)
Don Prior (AUS)
Alain Renaud (FRA)
Eduardo Ruiz (ARG)
Iwo Sakaida (JPN)
Claude Seidler (FRG)
Nikolai Stepanov (URS)
Patrick van Beneden (BEL)

Preliminary round

Group A

Group B

Classification round

Ninth to twelfth place classification

9–12th place semi-finals

Eleventh place game

Ninth place game

Fifth to eighth place classification

5–8th place semi-finals

Seventh place game

Fifth place game

Medal round

Semi-finals

Bronze medal match

Gold medal match

Statistics

Final standings

Goalscorers

References

External links
Official website

Men's tournament
Men's events at the 1988 Summer Olympics